Ken Lewis may refer to:

Ken Lewis (executive) (born 1947), former head of Bank of America
Ken Lewis (songwriter) (1940–2015), English singer, songwriter and record producer
Ken Lewis (cricketer) (born 1928), Welsh former cricketer
Ken Lewis (musician), American record producer, mixing engineer, and multi-instrumentalist
Kenneth Lewis (1916–1997), British politician
Kenneth Lewis (general) (c.1929–1992), Canadian air force general